Gofukakusa-in no shōshō no naishi ( died: around 1265), (also Shōshō no Naishi) was a Japanese poet during the Kamakura period. She was among the Thirty-Six Immortals of Poetry.

She was the daughter of the artist and aristocrat Fujiwara no Nobuzane and the younger sister of the poets Ben no naishi, Sōhekimon-in no shōshō and the painter Fujwara no Tametsugu. She served as the court lady of Emperor Go-Fukakusa, from where her nickname comes.

Together with her sister Ben no naishi, she belonged to a group of Renga-style poets whose works were included in the Tsukubashū collection created around 1356.

References 

1265 deaths
Year of birth unknown
Japanese poets
Japanese women poets

Kamakura period
Renga
Aristocracy of ancient Japan